Rhonda Knudsen (born 1958/1959) is an American politician and retired civil engineer serving as a member of the Montana House of Representatives from the 34th district. Elected in 2019, Knudsen succeeded her son, House Speaker Austin Knudsen.

Early life and education 
Knudsen was born and raised in Culbertson, Montana. She earned a Bachelor of Science degree from Montana State University.

Career 
Prior to entering politics, Knudsen worked as a civil engineer for the Natural Resources Conservation Service and Bureau of Indian Affairs. Knudsen was elected to the Montana House of Representatives in 2018 took office in 2019, succeeding her son, House Speaker Austin Knudsen, who was unable to seek re-election due to term limits and later announced his candidacy for Attorney General of Montana in the 2020 election.

Personal life 
Knudsen and her husband have two children, including Austin.

References 

21st-century American politicians
21st-century American women politicians
American civil engineers
Living people
Montana State University alumni
People from Roosevelt County, Montana
Republican Party members of the Montana House of Representatives
Women state legislators in Montana
Year of birth missing (living people)